Andrus Point is a prominent, rocky, digit-like headland that juts eastward into Lady Newnes Bay toward the floating glacier tongue of the Parker Glacier, in Victoria Land. It was mapped by the United States Geological Survey from surveys and from U.S. Navy air photos, 1960–64, and named by the Advisory Committee on Antarctic Names for Commander H.R. Andrus, logistics officer on the staff of the Commander, U.S. Naval Support Force, Antarctica, 1962–66.

References
 

Headlands of Victoria Land
Borchgrevink Coast